Saint Eulalia (in Spanish, Santa Eulalia; in Catalan, Santa Eulàlia or Santa Eulària; in French, Sainte-Eulalie) may refer to:

Art
 Saint Eulalia (Waterhouse painting), a painting by John William Waterhouse (1885)

People
Eulalia of Barcelona (290–303), saint interred in Barcelona, Spain
Eulalia of Mérida (290–304), saint interred in Mérida, Spain

Places

France 
Sainte-Eulalie (disambiguation)—various places in France (and one in Quebec) use this name

Guatemala 
Santa Eulalia, Huehuetenango, a municipality in the department of Huehuetenango

Mexico 
Santa Eulalia, Chihuahua, a town in the state of Chihuahua

Peru 
Santa Eulalia District, of Huarochirí Province
Rio Santa Eulalia, a river in Lima province that merges with the Rímac River

Portugal 
Silveiros e Rio Covo (Santa Eulália), a parish in Barcelos
, a parish in Arouca, Portugal
Santa Eulália de Fórnos, a parish in Freixo de Espada à Cinta

Spain 
Santa Eulalia de Oscos, a municipality in Asturias 
Santa Eulària des Riu, a town and municipality in Ibiza 
Saint Eulalia of Cabranes, capital of Cabranes in Asturias 
Santa Eulalia del Campo,a municipality in Aragon
Palau de Santa Eulàlia, a municipality in Catalonia
Santa Eulàlia (Barcelona Metro), a station of Barcelona Metro
, a neighbourhood of the municipality of L'Hospitalet de Llobregat in Catalonia

See also
Sequence of Saint Eulalia, an early Old French text
Eulalia (disambiguation)